Mikes may refer to:
 MIKES, Centre for Metrology and Accreditation, Finland, a research organisation
 Mikes (restaurant), a chain of Italian restaurants
 Mikes (surname), a surname
 Mikes, the Hungarian name for Miceşti village, Tureni Commune, Cluj County, Romania
 Mass-analyzed ion-kinetic-energy spectrometry in mass spectrometry

See also
 Mike (disambiguation)
 Mike's Hard Lemonade Co.